Ricardo Romo is an urban historian who served as the fifth President of the University of Texas at San Antonio from May 1999 to March 2017.

Early life
A native of San Antonio's Westside, Romo graduated from Fox Tech High School and attended the University of Texas at Austin on a track scholarship, where he was a member of the Texas Cowboys and Lambda Chi Alpha. Romo was the first Texas Longhorns athlete (and the 19th American in history) to break 4 minutes in the mile, running a time of 3 minutes, 58.8 seconds in 1966. The time set a school record that lasted 42 years.

He holds a master's degree in history from Loyola Marymount University and a Ph.D. in history from UCLA. Romo is an urban historian and the author of "East Los Angeles: History of a Barrio," which is now in its ninth printing (one was in Spanish).

Early academic career
In 1980, President Romo returned to UT Austin to teach history before becoming a vice provost for undergraduate education. From 1987 to 1993, Romo directed the Texas office of the Tomas Rivera Center, housed at Trinity University, where he evaluated the impact of governmental policies on Latinos. In 2002, George W. Bush appointed him to the President's Board of Advisers on Historically Black Colleges and Universities. In 2004, former Secretary of State Colin Powell appointed Romo as a U.S. representative to the United Nations Educational Scientific and Cultural Organization and in 2005 Romo was appointed to the Board of Directors of the Federal Reserve Bank of Dallas, San Antonio branch.

UTSA presidency
Under Romo's leadership, "The UTSA Plan: A Roadmap to Excellence" was presented. The plan is a strategic effort to enhance both access to education and excellence in scholarship and service at UTSA. As a result, UTSA plans to more than double the current number of tenured and tenure-track faculty by 2012 and develop additional doctoral programs and research institutes. To accommodate future growth, UTSA plans to add nearly $750 million in new facilities, which includes an $84 million science and engineering building completed in 2005.

In November 2007, he was recognized with the Isabel la Catolica award, the highest award given to non-Spanish subjects, bestowed by King Juan Carlos of Spain. In October 2008, he received the Distinguished Alumnus Award from the Texas Exes Alumni Association.

During President Romo's tenure, enrollment increased more than 50% and the university implemented a nearly $46 million renovation to the Recreation and Wellness Center, a 1,000-bed Olympic village-style housing complex and several new student support programs. The number of advisers has tripled, and UTSA is recognized as a leader in "Closing the Gaps," a statewide initiative by the Legislature to enroll more Texans in higher education.

On February 14, 2017, Romo was placed on administrative leave pending an investigation into his conduct regarding how he greeted women in his office. Romo had planned to retire in August 2017 after almost two decades with the university. He announced his resignation, effective immediately, on March 3, 2017. "I have been made aware that the manner in which I embraced women made them uncomfortable and was inappropriate," he said. Bexar County Judge Nelson Wolff claimed that the University of Texas System had  mishandled the investigation into his friend's conduct. Wolff said that he often embraces men and women in the workplace: "It's a tradition in the Hispanic community that you do that... It's just a tradition, one that I participate in." When the UT System's investigation was closed on March 3, the report’s executive summary stated, "The information gained in the probe supports the conclusion that President Romo engaged in sexual harassment and sexual misconduct against the victims..."

The lone finalist to succeed Romo as UTSA president was Thomas Taylor Eighmy (born September 1956), the vice chancellor for research and engagement at the University of Tennessee at Knoxville.

In the 2014-2015 academic year, Romo received a total compensation from UTSA in the amount of $530,704. The San Antonio Express-News questions details about the president's resignation: "The public may never be privy to the circumstances that prompted ... Romo to be placed on paid leave. Personnel issues are not subject to open records and disclosure laws. Details of such investigations become public only if lawsuits are filed ...", and suits are not anticipated in this case.

Personal life
Romo is married to Harriett Romo, UTSA professor of sociology. She also serves as director of the UTSA Mexico Center and the Bank of America Child and Adolescent Policy Research Institute (CAPRI). Both first-generation college graduates, the Romos have a son, Carlos, who graduated from Stanford University and the University of Texas School of Law. Their daughter, Anadelia, received a doctoral degree from Harvard University and teaches at Texas State University–San Marcos.

The Romos are avid art collectors. The collection includes works by Luis Jimenez, Carmen Lomas Garza, Cesar Martinez and Vincent Valdez, as well as print suites from Self Help Graphics and Coronado Studio. They have donated many prints from their collection to the Benson Latin American Collection.

An avid photographer, Romo’s works have been included in several regional art exhibits including "Havana," a collection of his prints taken in Cuba. His photos were featured in China's Popular Photography magazine, and his "Small Towns Texas" exhibit was displayed at the UTSA Institute of Texan Cultures.

References

1943 births
Heads of universities and colleges in the United States
Living people
Loyola Marymount University alumni
People from San Antonio
Texas Longhorns men's track and field athletes
Trinity University (Texas) people
University of California, Los Angeles alumni
University of Texas at San Antonio people